The Provençal Tales is a book written by Michael de Larrabeiti and published in 1988 by Pavilion Books. De Larrabeiti worked on the transhumance in the 1950s and 1960s; his book records stories apparently told to de Larrabeiti by Provençal shepherds.

External links
 Free PDF of the first chapter of The Provencal Tales

1988 books
Books by Michael de Larrabeiti
French folklore